Edith Zewelani Nawakwi (born ) is a Zambian politician and economist by profession. She is the first woman in Zambia to hold the post of Minister of Finance following her appointment in 1998 since Zambia's independence 33 years previously to that time. She was also the first woman to hold that post in the SADC region. She is the President of the Forum for Democracy and Development under which she ran for president at the 2016 general election.

Early life and education
Nawakwi was born in Mwenzo, Northern Province of Zambia. She holds a degree in Agriculture Economics and Business Management from the University of Zambia and a post-graduate diploma in Economics of Energy and Development from Imperial College London, London.

Career
Her political career saw her join the Movement for Multi-Party Democracy (MMD) in 1990. She held various political positions including Minister of State for Energy & Water Development, Minister of Energy & Water Development, Minister of Agriculture, Food & Fisheries, Minister of Finance and Minister of Labour & Social Security between 1992 and 2001.

In 2001, she and some ex-members of the Movement for Multi-Party Democracy formed the Forum for Democracy and Development where she served as the party's secretary-general and vice-president before she was elected party president in 2005, making her the first woman in Zambia to achieve such feat. In 2011, under the platform of the Forum for Democracy and Development, she was the only woman who contested in the 2011 general election, placing seventh on the log with a total of 6,833 votes. She also contested in the 2015 presidential election, placing third with a vote percentage of 0.92%. In 2016, she ran for the presidency at the 2016 general election where she placed third, receiving a total of 24,149 votes.

Personal life
She is married to Geofrey Hambulo with whom she has three children. In January 2013, one of her daughters, Hatamba Hambulo was murdered. Her dumped body was found in a manhole in Ibex Hill with her hands and legs tied.

References

1959 births
Living people
Finance Ministers of Zambia
Agriculture ministers of Zambia
University of Zambia alumni
Alumni of Imperial College London
People from Northern Province, Zambia
Forum for Democracy and Development politicians
Zambian economists
Zambian women economists
Female finance ministers
20th-century Zambian women politicians
20th-century Zambian politicians
21st-century Zambian women politicians
21st-century Zambian politicians
Women government ministers of Zambia
Members of the National Assembly of Zambia
Energy ministers of Zambia